David Olumide Aderinokun (born 18 August 1971) is a Nigerian politician and a member of the People's Democratic Party (PDP) Nigeria. Prior to his entrance into politics, he was a realtor who specialized in joint venture projects.

Early life 
Born on August 18, 1971, in Lagos, David Olumide Aderinokun had his elementary school at Albalti Nursery and Primary School, Papa-Ajao, Lagos. He then proceeded to Mushin Boys High School Isolo, Lagos and finished his secondary school education at Apata Memorial High School, Isolo, Lagos where he obtained his Secondary School Certificate.

He travelled abroad for tertiary education and attended the University of East London where he obtained a B.S.C (Hons), in Business Studies.

Political life 
Aderinokun entered politics in 2011 when he lost his bid to represent his Party at the Nigerian House of Representative on the platform of the People's Democratic Party (PDP). He tried again and won the Primaries to represent Abeokuta North Federal Constituency on October 3, 2018.

Personal life 
David Olumide Aderinokun is married to media personality Stephanie Coker. They married on August 12, 2017, on the Greek Island of Mykonos. They have a daughter who was born in November 2019.

References 

1971 births
Living people
Alumni of the University of East London
Peoples Democratic Party (Nigeria) politicians